Chung Eui Girls' High School was a Methodist girls' school in Pyongyang, North Korea founded in 1896.

History
The school was founded by Methodist missionary Mattie W. Noble in November 26th 1896, starting from educating 9 women, and the school taught elementary level reading. In 1899, Methodist missionary E. Douglas Follwell continued the works of the school. The school used to be run cooperatively with the Presbyterian church, but became independent from it in 1918.In 1920, Dillingham became the principal for the school, and improved the accommodations.

Notable alumni

Lee Tai-young

References

Schools in North Korea
Buildings and structures in Pyongyang
Educational institutions established in 1894
1894 establishments in Korea
Girls' schools in Asia